Moonray or moon ray may refer to:

 Moon Ray, an Italo disco group
 "Moonray" aka "Moon Ray", a 1939 Artie Shaw composition
 "Moonray", a 1962 song by Shirley Scott from Horace Silver on the album Shirley Scott Plays Horace Silver
 Moonray, a Dreamworks's open source ray tracing renderer; see

See also
Moonbeam (disambiguation)
Moonlight (disambiguation)
Moonshine (disambiguation)
Moon (disambiguation)
Ray (disambiguation)